Matthew Rogers (born July 12, 1993)  is an American professional soccer player who plays as an defender.

Club career
Rogers played four years of college soccer at Oral Roberts University between 2013 and 2016.

On February 1, 2019, Rogers joined USL Championship club Tulsa Roughnecks.

References

1993 births
Living people
American soccer players
Oral Roberts Golden Eagles men's soccer players
FC Tulsa players
USL Championship players
Association football defenders
Soccer players from Oklahoma